Collier City may refer to:
Collier City, Broward County, Florida, a neighborhood in Pompano Beach
Collier City, Collier County, Florida, a former town on Marco Island

sometimes pronounced or referred to as "Khia City"